Leonard Harper (2 June 1837 – 27 October 1915) was a 19th-century Member of Parliament in Canterbury, New Zealand.

Early life
Harper was born in 1837, either in Eton or Stratfield Mortimer in Berkshire, England. His father was Henry Harper, who became the first bishop of Christchurch. Leonard Harper and his brother Charles (1838–1920) came to New Zealand with Bishop George Selwyn, who returned from a visit to England on the Sir George Seymour, landing in Auckland on 5 July 1855. In May 1857, Harper was elected clerk of the Canterbury Provincial Council.

His father, Bishop Harper, arrived in Christchurch at the end of 1856. In 1857, his father heard from Tainui, a Ngāi Tahu leader from Kaiapoi, that some Māori wanted to travel to the West Coast via their traditional route along the Hurunui and Taramakau rivers. Tainui agreed that his son and two other Māori would lead Leonard Harper and Mr. Locke over the pass. While Edward Dobson had been over the pass only weeks before Harper, Dobson was stopped by bad weather. Harper descended to the coast and was thus the first European who had crossed the Southern Alps all the way from east coast to west coast. The pass has since been known as Harper Pass.

Political career

He represented the Cheviot electorate from 1876 to 1878, when he resigned. He then represented the Avon electorate from 1884 to 1887, when he again resigned. He bought Ilam homestead, once the largest residential building in Christchurch, and was for some years co-owner of Risingholme, which was bought from the estate of William Reeves.

Professional career
In 1857, Harper was employed as clerk to the Canterbury Provincial Council. In 1865, he joined the legal firm of Travers and Hanmer, run by William Travers and Philip Hanmer. His brother, George Harper, joined them in 1870 as a clerk. Hanmer died in November 1878, and his executors dissolved the partnership in May 1879. George Harper took Hanmer's place for a substantial payment to the executors, with the legal practice then continuing to operate as Harper and Harper.

Leonard Harper left New Zealand on 25 July 1891. Three days later, he was voted in absentia the inaugural chair of the New Zealand Alpine Club. It only emerged later that his law firm was bankrupt, and that NZ£200,000 had been embezzled.

Family and death
He later lived on Jersey, the largest of the Channel Islands, where he died in 1915.

Emily Acland was his eldest sister (1830–1905). She married the farmer and politician John Acland in 1860. The politician and farmer Charles Blakiston married his second sister, Mary Anna Harper (1832–1924). The priest Henry Harper (1833–1922) was his eldest brother. Ellen Shephard Harper(1834–1916) was his third sister; she married the farmer Charles George Tripp. Arthur Paul Harper was his son.

Notes

References

|-

|-

1837 births
1915 deaths
Members of the New Zealand House of Representatives
New Zealand MPs for Christchurch electorates
19th-century New Zealand politicians
Leonard